Springbank Cemetery is located on Countesswells Road, Aberdeen. It opened in 1884.

The cemetery is operated by the local authority, Aberdeen City Council, is one of seventeen cemeteries in Aberdeen. It is located on Countesswells Road with entrances on both Countesswells Road and Springfield Road where the cemetery lodge is situated.

According to Historic Environment Scotland, at the south-west corner of the cemetery there formerly stood Springbank Cottage.

Notable graves 
The cemetery contains 95 war graves, 36 from the First World War and 59 from the Second World War

 William Dove Paterson a pioneer of early cinema
 James Reid Rust Lord Provost of Aberdeen and Lord Lieutenant of Aberdeenshire
 Sir James Taggart, Lord Provost of Aberdeen 1914 to 1919

References 

Aberdeen
Cemeteries in Scotland